François Guillemot,  is a French neurobiologist, currently working at the Francis Crick Institute in London. His research focuses on the behaviour of neural stem cells in embryos and adult brains.

Life and career 

After studying at the École Normale Supérieure in Paris, France, Guillemot took his Ph.D. in immunology at the Institut d’Embryologie du CNRS. This was followed by postdoctoral research at Harvard Medical School and Mount Sinai Hospital, Toronto. Between 1994 and 2002, Guillemot set up and ran a laboratory at the Institut de Génétique et de Biologie Moléculaire et Cellulaire in Strasbourg. He then relocated to the National Institute for Medical Research in London in 2002, where he was head of the Division of Molecular Neurobiology, before moving to the Francis Crick Institute the following decade. He has been President of the International Society for Developmental Neurobiology since 2009.

Research 

Guillemot's research investigates stem cells at the molecular level and how they become different types of cells in the brain. His research has focused on proneural genes, including ASCL1 (MASH1) and neurogenins 1,2 and 3. His two current strands of research are to understand the gene regulatory networks that control neural stem cells and the function of individual genes within these cells. By learning how neural cells form and develop, Guillemot hopes to develop new therapies for brain disorders.

Awards 

Guillemot was awarded the Ribeiro Caro Almela Prize for Research in Developmental Neurobiology in 2007. He  was elected to the European Molecular Biology Organization (EMBO) in 2000, became a Fellow of the Academy of Medical Sciences (FMedSci) in 2009, and a Fellow of the Royal Society (FRS) in 2020.

Selected publications

References

External links
 

Year of birth missing (living people)
Living people
French neuroscientists
Fellows of the Royal Society
Fellows of the Academy of Medical Sciences (United Kingdom)
Academics of the Francis Crick Institute